Symmimetis cristata is a moth in the family Geometridae. It is found in Sri Lanka and India.

The larvae feed on the young leaves of Aglaia species. The larvae are small and shining black with an orange head. They sit on the edges of the leaves of their host plant, resting in a looped posture. Pupation takes place in a cell of open silk web under a leaf at a rolled over edge.

References

Moths described in 1897
Eupitheciini